The Thomas King Inscription is an artifact of the early exploration of the coast of the U.S. state of Maine.  It consists of the carving by Thomas King of his name and the year 1605 on a rock above the tide line in Davis Cove, an inlet on the southern coastline of Cushing, Maine.  King was a boatswain on the 1605 expedition of George Weymouth, which explored the area in search of the Northwest Passage to India.

The inscription site was listed on the National Register of Historic Places in 1979.

See also
National Register of Historic Places listings in Knox County, Maine

References

Archaeological sites on the National Register of Historic Places in Maine
Buildings and structures completed in 1605
Buildings and structures in Knox County, Maine
National Register of Historic Places in Knox County, Maine